Goudarz Habibi (born 23 February 1947) is an Iranian former footballer who played as a defender for Iran national football team at the 1972 Summer Olympics and 1970 RCD Cup. At the club level he played for Taj Tehran.

External links
 
 Goudarz Habibi at TeamMelli.com

Living people
1947 births
Iranian footballers
Iran international footballers
Association football defenders
Esteghlal F.C. players
Asian Games silver medalists for Iran
Asian Games medalists in football
Footballers at the 1966 Asian Games
Medalists at the 1966 Asian Games
20th-century Iranian people